Vladimir Zoloev (born 8 April 1993) is a Kyrgyzstani judoka. He competed in the -81 kg category at the 2018 Asian Games and in the Asian Judo Championships.

Achievements

References

External links
 

1993 births
Judoka at the 2018 Asian Games
Asian Games bronze medalists for Kyrgyzstan
Asian Games medalists in judo
Medalists at the 2018 Asian Games
Kyrgyzstani male judoka
Kyrgyzstani people of Russian descent
Living people
Islamic Solidarity Games medalists in judo
Islamic Solidarity Games competitors for Kyrgyzstan
Judoka at the 2020 Summer Olympics
Olympic judoka of Kyrgyzstan
20th-century Kyrgyzstani people
21st-century Kyrgyzstani people